Calvin Burnett may refer to:

 Calvin Burnett (artist) (1921–2007), American artist and illustrator
 Calvin Burnett (Guyanese cricketer) (born 1954), Guyanese cricketer
 Calvin Burnett (Scottish cricketer) (born 1990), Scottish cricketer